Trechus ithae is a species of ground beetle in the subfamily Trechinae. It was described by Reitter in 1888.

References

ithae
Beetles described in 1888